Doux may refer to:
 Doux, Ardennes, a French commune in the Ardennes department
 Doux, Deux-Sèvres, a French commune in the Deux-Sèvres department
 Doux (river), a tributary of the Rhône in southern France
 Doux (wine), a variety of sparkling wine
 Doux Group, a French poultry company
Doux (surname)

See also 
 Megas doux
 Dux (disambiguation)